The Statute Law Revision Act 1953 is an Act of the Parliament of the United Kingdom.

This Act was partly in force in Great Britain at the end of 2010.

The enactments which were repealed (whether for the whole or any part of the United Kingdom) by this Act were repealed so far as they extended to the Isle of Man on 25 July 1991.

The effect of this Act is set out in the Report of the Joint Committee on Consolidation and Statute Law Revision Bills, with the proceedings and minutes of evidence, dated 19 November 1953.

Section 1 - Repeal of enactments
This section was repealed for the United Kingdom by Group 1 of Part IX of Schedule 1 to the Statute Law (Repeals) Act 1998.

Section 2 - Application of repealed enactments in local courts
The words "to the court of the county palatine of Lancaster or" in this section were repealed by section 56(4) of, and Part II of Schedule 11 to, the Courts Act 1971. This section was repealed by section 32(4) of, and Part V of Schedule 5 to, the Administration of Justice Act 1977.

Section 4 - Provisions relating to Northern Ireland
Section 4(1) was repealed by section 41(1) of, and Part 1 of Schedule 6 to, the Northern Ireland Constitution Act 1973.

Schedules 1 to 3
Schedules 1 to 3 were repealed by section 1 of, and Part XI of the Schedule to, the Statute Law (Repeals) Act 1974.

Schedule 4 - Omissions from First Schedule to the Statute Law Revision Act, 1950, by virtue of s. 3 of this Act
The entry relating to section 22 of the Naval Volunteers Act 1853 was repealed by section 1 of, and Part XI of the Schedule to, the Statute Law (Repeals) Act 1974.

The entry relating to the Agricultural Development Act 1939 was repealed by section 36(1)(a) of, and Part I of the Schedule to, the Agriculture Act 1957.

See also
Statute Law Revision Act

References
Halsbury's Statutes,
The Public General Acts and Church Assembly Measures of 1953. HMSO. 1953.
HL Deb vol 184, cols 202 to 204 and 861 to 862, HC Deb vol 521, col 2193.

External links

United Kingdom Acts of Parliament 1953